Scotinotylus pallidus is a species of sheet weaver found in Canada and the United States. It was described by Emerton in 1882.

References

Linyphiidae
Spiders of North America
Spiders described in 1882